Washington Township is one of the fourteen townships of Clermont County, Ohio, United States. The 2010 census reported 2,278 people living in the township, 1,993 of whom were in the unincorporated portions of the township.

Geography
Located in the southern part of the county along the Ohio River, it borders the following townships:
Monroe Township - north
Tate Township - northeast
Franklin Township - east

Across the Ohio River, Washington Township borders Kentucky to the south and west:
Bracken County - south
Pendleton County - west
Campbell County - northwest

Two villages are located in Washington Township along the Ohio River: Moscow in the west, and Neville in the southwest.

Name and history
Washington Township was organized in 1801.

It is one of 43 Washington Townships statewide.

Government
The township is governed by a three-member board of trustees, who are elected in November of odd-numbered years to a four-year term beginning on the following January 1. Two are elected in the year after the presidential election and one is elected in the year before it. There is also an elected township fiscal officer, who serves a four-year term beginning on April 1 of the year after the election, which is held in November of the year before the presidential election. Vacancies in the fiscal officership or on the board of trustees are filled by the remaining trustees. Ron Rudd is the longest-serving current trustee, having occupied the office in 1992.  With David Peters serving as 2nd longest served in office currently and following is Trustee Dennis Cooper

References

External links
Township website
County website

Townships in Clermont County, Ohio